Neckarsulm TDS Office Tower is a 20 floor tall office building in Neckarsulm, Germany. Neckarsulm TDS Office Tower houses the offices of TDS AG, dsb AG and the LIDL training center.

TDS Office Tower was constructed during the period 1997 to 1999. Including the roof-mounted antenna it is 103 metres tall and the tallest office building in the Heilbronn area.

External links 
 Google Maps image of the tower 
 Skscraperpage.com

Buildings and structures in Heilbronn (district)
Office buildings in Germany
Towers in Germany
20th-century architecture in Germany